The 2004 Crawley Borough Council election took place on 10 June 2004 to elect members of Crawley Borough Council in West Sussex, England. Boundary changes had taken place, so the entire council was up for election. The Labour Party stayed in overall control of the council, albeit with a majority of just one seat.

After the election, the composition of the council was:
Labour 19
Conservative 16
Liberal Democrats 2

Ward results

Bewbush (3)

Broadfield North (2)

Broadfield South (2)

Furnace Green (2)

Gossops Green (2)

Ifield (3)

Langley Green (3)

Maidenbower (3)

Northgate (2)

Pound Hill North (3)

Pound Hill South and Worth (3)

Southgate (3)

Three Bridges (2)

Tilgate (2)

West Green (2)

References

2004 English local elections
2004
2000s in West Sussex